Brad Stephen "Taylor" Negron (August 1, 1957 – January 10, 2015) was an American actor. He is perhaps best known for his role as Milo in the 1991 buddy cop action comedy film The Last Boy Scout.

Early life 
Negron was born in Glendale, California, the son of Puerto Rican couple Lucy (née Rosario) and Conrad Negron, Sr.  His cousin is singer and musician Chuck Negron, of Three Dog Night fame. He grew up in La Cañada Flintridge, California, and graduated from the University of California Los Angeles.

Career

Breaking into comedy, Hollywood 
Negron's career in comedy began while he was still in high school, with a stand-up performance at the Comedy Store in West Hollywood. After this appearance, Negron ventured into being a Hollywood extra, as well as a repeat contestant on Chuck Barris' ABC daytime show The Dating Game.

Before his film career began, Negron was exposed to dramatic and comedic legends Lee Strasberg and Lucille Ball. In a work-study program at the Actors Studio, Negron worked as Strasberg's assistant. At Sherwood Oaks Experimental College in 1977, Negron worked as Ball's intern while she was a guest teacher at the school.

Film 
Negron's motion picture appearances included Angels in the Outfield, The Aristocrats, Better Off Dead, Call Me Claus, Easy Money as the tenacious son-in-law of Rodney Dangerfield's character, Fast Times at Ridgemont High, River's Edge, The Last Boy Scout, Nothing but Trouble, Punchline, The Stoned Age, Stuart Little, Young Doctors in Love, Funky Monkey, Biodome   with Pauly Shore, How I Got into College, and Amy Heckerling's Vamps, in which he reprised his Fast Times at Ridgemont High pizza delivery scene.

Television and internet 
Among Negron's television appearances are guest star roles on Hill Street Blues, That's So Raven, So Little Time, The Fresh Prince of Bel-Air, The Ben Stiller Show, Curb Your Enthusiasm, Reno 911!, Friends, My Wife and Kids, Seinfeld, ER,  Party of Five, and Falcon Crest. In addition to being a semiregular guest on Off Beat Cinema, he co-starred in Smart Guy and Wizards of Waverly Place. He appeared in Comedy Central's UnCabaret special as well as its Amazon episodes. He appeared as Melinda Hill's date in one episode of the 2013 web series Romantic Encounters. His last television role was the part of an acting coach in Season 1, Episode 5 of The Comedians starring Billy Crystal and Josh Gad.  He also appeared on an episode of The Dating Game on March 16, 1970.

Writer 
In 2008, he wrote The Unbearable Lightness of Being Taylor Negron – A Fusion of Story and Song, directed by opera director David Schweitzer and co-starring singer/songwriter Logan Heftel. The show debuted to critical acclaim in the Green Room at the Edinburgh Comedy Festival. It also ran in the 2009 Best of New York Solo Festival at the SoHo Playhouse and at the Barrow Street Theater. Kate Copstick of The Scotsman wrote of it, "The underlying theme of this spellbinding hour seems to be Nietzschean – 'that which does not destroy me makes me strong'. And if that doesn't sound like out-and-out comedy, then that is good. Because the show is not out-and-out comedy. It is a mix of music, storytelling, and comedy." His comedy essays have been published in the anthology Dirty Laundry (Phoenix Books) and Love West Hollywood: Reflections of Los Angeles (Alyson Books).

Director Justin Tanner revived Negron's play Gangster Planet, a four-character domestic comedy set during the 1992 Los Angeles riots, which was chosen by the Los Angeles Times as a Critic's Choice. Another play, Downward Facing Bitch, a suspense comedy, was developed with director Kiff Scholl. Negron was a regular contributor to Wendy Hammer's Tasty Words, Jill Solloway's "Sit and Spin", and Hilary Carlip's online magazine Fresh Yarns, as well as the Huffington Post. He performed regularly across the United States and was one of the original members of the UnCabaret, dubbed "The Mother Show of Alternative Comedy" by the LA Weekly, where Negron fused standup, dada poetry, and stream of consciousness storytelling.

Painter 
Negron was an accomplished painter whose artwork has been featured in solo exhibitions at venues such as Los Angeles' Laemmle Royal Theater and the Hotel de Ville Lifestyle. Although he left his initial art school education when he was 19 years old, Negron later received training at the Academy of Fine Arts in San Francisco and the Art Students League in New York City.  His work was influenced by Henri Matisse, Jean-Édouard Vuillard, Don Bachardy, and David Hockney.

Personal life 
Negron was gay.

Death 
Negron was diagnosed with liver cancer in 2008. On January 10, 2015, he died at his home in Los Angeles, California, surrounded by family, at the age of 57.

Filmography

Film

Video games

References

External links 

Official website

Interview , g4tv.com
Profile, jointhemediacircus.com
Taylor Negron profile, Aveleyman.com

1957 births
2015 deaths
20th-century American male actors
20th-century American comedians
21st-century American male actors
21st-century American comedians
American male film actors
American male television actors
American painters
American people of Puerto Rican descent
American stand-up comedians
Comedians from California
Deaths from liver cancer
Deaths from cancer in California
American gay actors
American gay artists
American gay writers
Gay comedians
LGBT Hispanic and Latino American people
LGBT people from California
Male actors from Glendale, California
People from La Cañada Flintridge, California
American LGBT comedians